Model 45  may refer to:
 Model 45A, an experimental rifle developed by the U.S. Army in 1945.
 Beech Model 45, better known as the T-34 Mentor, an American basic training aircraft.
 Fairchild Model 45, an American utility aircraft of the 1930s.
 Firestone Model 45, better known as the XR-9, an American experimental helicopter of the late 1940s.
 Wedell-Williams Model 45, an American racing aircraft of the 1930s.